Colcord is an unincorporated community in Raleigh County, West Virginia, United States. Colcord had a post office, which closed on November 30, 2002. The community was named after the proprietor of the Colcord Coal Company.

References

Unincorporated communities in Raleigh County, West Virginia
Unincorporated communities in West Virginia
Coal towns in West Virginia